was a town located in Kanra District, Gunma Prefecture, Japan.

On March 27, 2006, Myōgi was merged into the expanded city of Tomioka.

In 2003, the town had an estimated population of 4,901 and a density of 170.41 persons per km². The total area was 28.76 km².

See also
 Mount Myōgi

External links
 Tomioka official website 

Dissolved municipalities of Gunma Prefecture
Tomioka, Gunma